Eutelia snelleni is a moth of the family Noctuidae. It is known from Sierra Leone, Nigeria and Madagascar.

It has a wingspan of approx. 20 mm.

Saalmüller described this species from a holotype from Madagascar and named this species after the Dutch entomologist Pieter Cornelius Tobias Snellen.

References

External links
 Africanmoths - Picture of Eutelia snelleni

Moths described in 1881
Euteliinae
Moths of Madagascar
Moths of Africa
Insects of West Africa

fr:Eutelia blandiatrix